Guzmania angustifolia is a species of flowering plant in the Bromeliaceae family. It is native to Costa Rica, Nicaragua, Panama, Colombia, and Ecuador.

References

angustifolia
Flora of Central America
Flora of South America
Plants described in 1884
Taxa named by John Gilbert Baker
Taxa named by Ludwig Wittmack